

The Elias TA-1 was a 1920s American biplane training aircraft built by Elias. Only three aircraft were built for evaluation by the United States Army Air Service.

The TA-1 (a United States military designation Trainer, Aircooled No. 1) was designed to meet a United States Army requirement for a training aircraft for the air service. The TA-1 was a conventional two-seat biplane. Three were built, two with a Lawrance R-1 engine and another with an ABC Wasp, the last two under McCook field project numbers Elias P-178 and Elias P-179. The aircraft performance was inferior to the other aircraft under evaluation (the Dayton-Wright TA-3) and no orders were placed or further aircraft built.

Operators

United States Army Air Service

Specifications (TA-1)

References
 John Andrade, U.S.Military Aircraft Designations and Serials since 1909, Midland Counties Publications, 1979,  (Page 171)
 The Illustrated Encyclopedia of Aircraft (Part Work 1982-1985), 1985, Orbis Publishing, Page 1599

External links
 G. Elias Brothers M-1 mail plane at the Buffalo Airport.

See also

1920s United States military trainer aircraft
TA-1